John Egan Leahy was a member of the Wisconsin State Assembly and the Wisconsin State Senate.

Biography
Leahy was born on February 15, 1842, in Dover, New Hampshire. He attended what is now the University of Wisconsin–Madison. During the American Civil War, Leahy served as an officer with the 35th Wisconsin Volunteer Infantry Regiment. On December 31, 1872, he married Mary D. McCrossen. He died on December 23, 1915, and is buried in Wausau, Wisconsin.

Political career
Leahy was elected to the Assembly in 1882 and to the Senate in 1886. Additionally, he was a member of the School Board and City Council, as well as Mayor of Wausau. He was an Independent Democrat and a Republican.

References

External links

The Political Graveyard

People from Dover, New Hampshire
Politicians from Wausau, Wisconsin
Wisconsin state senators
Members of the Wisconsin State Assembly
Mayors of places in Wisconsin
Wisconsin city council members
School board members in Wisconsin
Wisconsin Republicans
Wisconsin Independents
Wisconsin Democrats
People of Wisconsin in the American Civil War
Union Army officers
University of Wisconsin–Madison alumni
1842 births
1915 deaths
Burials in Wisconsin
19th-century American politicians